The 1915 Columbia Lions football team was an American football team that represented Columbia University as an independent during the 1915 college football season. Playing their first season in 10 years, the Lions were led by head coach T. Nelson Metcalf to a 5–0 record, outscoring opponents .  The team played its home games on South Field, part of the university's campus in Morningside Heights in Upper Manhattan, with temporary grandstands to accommodate spectators.

Schedule

References

Columbia
Columbia Lions football seasons
College football undefeated seasons
Columbia Lions football